Sheung Ling Pei is a village in Tung Chung on Lantau Island, Hong Kong.

Administration
Sheung Ling Pei is a recognized village under the New Territories Small House Policy.

See also
 Tung Chung Fort

References

External links
 Delineation of area of existing village Sheung Ling Pei (Tung Chung) for election of resident representative (2019 to 2022)

Villages in Islands District, Hong Kong
Tung Chung